Washington Township is the name of three townships in Illinois:

 Washington Township, Carroll County, Illinois
 Washington Township, Tazewell County, Illinois
 Washington Township, Will County, Illinois

See also

Washington Township (disambiguation)

Illinois township disambiguation pages